Littleborough is a town in the Metropolitan Borough of Rochdale, Greater Manchester, England, and it is unparished.  The town, its suburbs of Calderbrook and Smithy Bridge, and the surrounding countryside contain 79 listed buildings that are recorded in the National Heritage List for England.  Of these, five are listed at Grade II*, the middle grade, and the others are at Grade II, the lowest grade.  The area is largely rural, and most of the listed buildings are houses and associated structures, farmhouses, and farm buildings.  Following the Industrial Revolution textile mills were built, some of which remain and are listed.  The Rochdale Canal passes through the area and bridges and locks associated with it are listed.  Also passing through the area was the Manchester and Leeds Railway, and structures associated with it are listed.  The other listed buildings include churches, public houses, a former toll house, a bandstand, a drinking fountain, and two war memorials.


Key

Buildings

Notes and references

Notes

Citations

Sources

Lists of listed buildings in Greater Manchester
Buildings and structures in the Metropolitan Borough of Rochdale
Littleborough, Greater Manchester